Maydolong, officially the Municipality of Maydolong, is a 4th class municipality in the province of Eastern Samar, Philippines. According to the 2020 census, it has a population of 15,314 people.

Etymology
There are two stories about the naming of Maydolong. Officially accepted by the Sangguniang Bayan is the story of a fisherman who used to travel to the village of Matnog. Because they needed to rest from their travel along the east coast of Samar, these fisherman used to say "Matnog it Dolong" which means "the bow must point to Matnog" in the local dialect. This saying got shortened to Maydolong, which eventually became the name of the village.

History
Maydolong comprised barrios Maydolong, Balogo, Maybocog, Omawas, Tagaslian, Kampakirit, Suribao, Mayburak, Kanmanungdong, Malobago, Tabi, Maytigbao, and Kanluterio, which used to belong to the Municipality of Borongan, Eastern Samar.

Geography

Barangays
Maydolong is politically subdivided into 20 barangays.

Climate

Demographics

Economy

References

External links
 Official Website of the Municipality Maydolong
 [ Philippine Standard Geographic Code]
 Philippine Census Information
 Local Governance Performance Management System

Municipalities of Eastern Samar